Daniele Bracciali and Rubén Ramírez Hidalgo were the defending champions but decided not to participate. Bracciali competed in the UNICEF Open instead.

Adrián Menéndez and Simone Vagnozzi won the tournament defeating Andrea Arnaboldi and Leonardo Tavares 0–6, 6–3, [10–5].

Seeds

  Adrián Menéndez /  Simone Vagnozzi (champions)
  Tomasz Bednarek /  Mateusz Kowalczyk (first round)
  Brian Dabul /  Pere Riba (quarterfinals, withdrew)
  Olivier Charroin /  Sadik Kadir (semifinals)

Draw

Draw

References
 Main Draw

Aspria Tennis Cup Trofeo City Life - Doubles
Aspria Tennis Cup